The 1980 Southeastern Conference baseball tournament was held at Perry Field in Gainesville, Florida, from May 9 through 11.  won the tournament and earned the Southeastern Conference's automatic bid to the 1980 NCAA Tournament.

Regular season results

Tournament

All-Tournament Team

See also 
 College World Series
 NCAA Division I Baseball Championship
 Southeastern Conference baseball tournament

References 

2. SECSports.com All-Time Baseball Tournament Results
3. SECSports.com All-Tourney Team Lists

Tournament
Southeastern Conference Baseball Tournament
Southeastern Conference baseball tournament
Southeastern Conference baseball tournament
College baseball tournaments in Florida
Baseball competitions in Gainesville, Florida